Envoy Air serves the following destinations:

Bahamas
Abaco Islands
Marsh Harbour – Marsh Harbour Airport
Treasure Cay – Treasure Cay Airport
Eleuthera
North Eleuthera – North Eleuthera Airport
Exuma
George Town – Exuma International Airport
Grand Bahama Island
Freeport – Grand Bahama International Airport
New Providence Island
Nassau – Nassau International Airport

Canada
Ontario
Toronto – Toronto Pearson International Airport
Quebec
Montreal – Montréal–Trudeau International Airport
Quebec City – Québec City Jean Lesage International Airport

Colombia
Archipelago of San Andrés, Providencia and Santa Catalina
San Andrés – Gustavo Rojas Pinilla International Airport

Mexico
Aguascalientes
Aguascalientes – Aguascalientes International Airport
Chihuahua
Chihuahua – Chihuahua International Airport
Coahuila
Torreón – Torreón International Airport
Durango
Durango – Durango International Airport
Guanajuato
León – Del Bajío International Airport
Guerrero
Acapulco – Acapulco International Airport
Oaxaca
Huatulco – Bahías de Huatulco International Airport
Oaxaca – Oaxaca International Airport
Querétaro
Querétaro – Querétaro Intercontinental Airport
Sinaloa
Mazatlán – Mazatlán International Airport

United States
Alabama
Birmingham – Birmingham-Shuttlesworth International Airport
Huntsville/Decatur – Huntsville International Airport
Mobile – Mobile Regional Airport
Montgomery – Montgomery Regional Airport
Arkansas
Fayetteville – Northwest Arkansas National Airport
Ft. Smith – Fort Smith Regional Airport
Little Rock – Little Rock National Airport
Texarkana – Texarkana Regional Airport
California
San Luis Obispo – San Luis Obispo County Regional Airport
Santa Rosa – Charles M. Schulz–Sonoma County Airport
Colorado
Montrose – Montrose Regional Airport [seasonal]
Grand Junction, Colorado – Grand Junction Regional Airport
Gunnison, Colorado – Gunnison-Crested Butte Regional Airport [seasonal]
Connecticut
Hartford – Bradley International Airport
Florida
Fort Myers – Southwest Florida International Airport
Ft. Walton Beach – Northwest Florida Regional Airport
Gainesville – Gainesville Regional Airport
Jacksonville – Jacksonville International Airport
Key West – Key West International Airport
Miami – Miami International Airport Hub
Pensacola – Pensacola International Airport
Tallahassee – Tallahassee Regional Airport
Tampa – Tampa International Airport
Georgia
Atlanta – Hartsfield-Jackson Atlanta International Airport
Savannah – Savannah/Hilton Head International Airport
 Augusta – Augusta Regional Airport 
 Idaho
 Boise – Boise International Airport
Illinois
Bloomington – Central Illinois Regional Airport
Champaign – University of Illinois Willard Airport
Chicago – O'Hare International Airport Hub
Moline – Quad City International Airport
Peoria  – General Wayne Downing Peoria International Airport
Springfield – Abraham Lincoln Capital Airport
Indiana
Evansville – Evansville Regional Airport
Ft. Wayne – Fort Wayne International Airport
Indianapolis – Indianapolis International Airport
Iowa
Cedar Rapids – The Eastern Iowa Airport
Des Moines  – Des Moines International Airport
Dubuque  – Dubuque Regional Airport
Sioux City – Sioux Gateway Airport
Waterloo – Waterloo Regional Airport
Kansas
Garden City – Garden City Regional Airport
Manhattan – Manhattan Regional Airport
Wichita – Wichita Eisenhower National Airport
Kentucky
Cincinnati – Cincinnati-Northern Kentucky International Airport
Louisville – Louisville International Airport
Lexington – Blue Grass Airport
Louisiana
Alexandria – Alexandria International Airport
Baton Rouge – Baton Rouge Metropolitan Airport
Lafayette – Lafayette Regional Airport
Lake Charles  – Lake Charles Regional Airport
Monroe  – Monroe Regional Airport
New Orleans – Louis Armstrong International Airport
Shreveport – Shreveport Regional Airport
Maryland
Baltimore  – Baltimore-Washington International Airport
Michigan
Detroit – Detroit Metropolitan Wayne County Airport
Grand Rapids – Gerald R. Ford International Airport
Flint – Bishop International Airport
Kalamazoo – Kalamazoo-Battle Creek International Airport
Marquette – Sawyer International Airport
Traverse City  – Cherry Capital Airport
Minnesota
Minneapolis – Minneapolis-Saint Paul International Airport
Rochester  – Rochester International Airport
Mississippi
Jackson – Jackson-Evers International Airport
Gulfport – Gulfport-Biloxi International Airport
Missouri
Joplin – Joplin Regional Airport
Kansas City – Kansas City International Airport
St. Louis – Lambert-St. Louis International Airport
Springfield – Springfield-Branson National Airport
 Montana
 Billings – Billings Logan International Airport
 Bozeman – Bozeman Yellowstone International Airport
 Kalispell – Glacier Park International Airport
 Missoula – Missoula International Airport
Nebraska
Grand Island – Central Nebraska Regional Airport
Omaha – Eppley Airfield
New Hampshire
Manchester – Manchester-Boston Regional Airport
New Jersey
Newark – Newark Liberty International Airport
New Mexico
Albuquerque – Albuquerque International Sunport
Roswell – Roswell International Air Center
New York
Buffalo – Buffalo Niagara International Airport
New York City
John F. Kennedy International Airport
LaGuardia Airport
Rochester – Greater Rochester International Airport
Syracuse – Syracuse Hancock International Airport
Watertown – Watertown International Airport
White Plains – Westchester County Airport
North Carolina
Asheville – Asheville Regional Airport
Charlotte – Charlotte/Douglas International Airport
Greensboro – Piedmont Triad International Airport
Raleigh – Raleigh-Durham International Airport
North Dakota
Fargo – Hector International Airport
Ohio
Cleveland – Hopkins International Airport
Columbus – John Glenn Columbus International Airport
Cincinnati – Cincinnati/Northern Kentucky International Airport
Dayton – Dayton International Airport
Toledo – Toledo Express Airport
Oklahoma
Lawton – Lawton-Fort Sill Regional Airport
Oklahoma City – Will Rogers World Airport
Stillwater – Stillwater Regional Airport
Tulsa – Tulsa International Airport
Pennsylvania
Harrisburg – Harrisburg International Airport
Philadelphia – Philadelphia International Airport
Pittsburgh – Pittsburgh International Airport
Wilkes-Barre – Wilkes-Barre/Scranton International Airport
 Rhode Island
 Providence – T. F. Green Airport
South Carolina
Charleston – Charleston International Airport
Columbia – Columbia Metropolitan Airport
Greenville – Greenville-Spartanburg International Airport
Myrtle Beach – Myrtle Beach International Airport
South Dakota
Sioux Falls – Sioux Falls Regional Airport
Tennessee
Chattanooga – Chattanooga Metropolitan Airport
Knoxville – McGhee Tyson Airport
Memphis – Memphis International Airport
Texas
Abilene – Abilene Regional Airport
Amarillo – Rick Husband Amarillo International Airport
Brownsville – Brownsville/South Padre Island International Airport
College Station – Easterwood Airport
Corpus Christi – Corpus Christi International Airport
Dallas-Fort Worth Metroplex – Dallas/Fort Worth International Airport Hub
Del Rio – Del Rio International Airport
El Paso – El Paso International Airport
Houston
George Bush Intercontinental Airport
William P. Hobby Airport
Killeen – Killeen-Fort Hood Regional Airport
Laredo – Laredo International Airport
Longview – East Texas Regional Airport
Lubbock – Lubbock Preston Smith International Airport
Midland/Odessa – Midland International Airport
San Angelo – Mathis Field
Tyler – Tyler Pounds Regional Airport
Waco – Waco Regional Airport
Wichita Falls – Wichita Falls Municipal Airport
Virginia
Norfolk – Norfolk International Airport
Richmond – Richmond International Airport
District of Columbia
Washington – Ronald Reagan Washington National Airport
 Washington
 Spokane – Spokane International Airport
West Virginia
Huntington – Tri-State Airport
Wisconsin
Appleton – Appleton International Airport
Green Bay – Austin Straubel International Airport
La Crosse – La Crosse Regional Airport
Madison – Dane County Regional Airport
Milwaukee – General Mitchell International Airport
Wausau – Central Wisconsin Airport

References

External links
 

Lists of airline destinations
Oneworld affiliate destinations
American Airlines